The Royal coat of arms of Great Britain was the coat of arms representing royal authority in the sovereign state of the Kingdom of Great Britain, in existence from 1707 to 1801. The kingdom came into being on 1 May 1707, with the political union of the kingdom of Scotland and the kingdom of England, which included Wales. With the 1706 Treaty of Union (ratified by the Acts of Union 1707), it was agreed to create a single kingdom, encompassing the whole of the island of Great Britain and its outlying islands, but not Ireland, which remained a separate realm under the newly created British crown.

On 1 January 1801, the royal arms of Great Britain were superseded by the royal arms of the United Kingdom of Great Britain and Ireland, when Great Britain was united with the Kingdom of Ireland by the Acts of Union of 1800 following the suppression of the Irish Rebellion of 1798.

Union of the Crowns and the Commonwealth

After the Acts of Union 1707

Notes

Coat of arms
Great Britain
Great Britain
Great Britain
Great Britain
Great Britain
Great Britain
Great Britain
Great Britain
Great Britain
Great Britain
Great Britain
Great Britain
Great Britain
Great Britain